"Funky Pretty" is a song by American rock band the Beach Boys from their January 1973 album Holland. Themed around astrology, the song was written by Brian Wilson, Mike Love, and Jack Rieley. Carl Wilson explained that the song was quickly recorded in a "spontaneous flurry". Brian was an active participant in its production, a rare occurrence at the time. In April 1973, it was issued as the B-side to their single "California Saga/California".

Background
Rolling Stone wrote of the song in its review of Holland: 

Asked about the song in a 2013 interview, manager Jack Rieley said:

Drummer Ricky Fataar remembered,

Guitarist Blondie Chaplin stated,

Personnel
Credits from Craig Slowinski, John Brode, Will Crerar and Joshilyn Hoisington

The Beach Boys
Blondie Chaplin - lead (chorus) and backing vocals
Al Jardine - lead (chorus) vocals
Mike Love - lead (chorus) and backing vocals
Brian Wilson - backing vocals, upright piano, drums, congas, Moog synthesizers, producer
Carl Wilson - lead (verse and bridge) and backing vocals, electric guitar, producer

Additional musicians
Billy Hinsche - backing vocals
Diane Rovell - backing vocals
Marilyn Wilson - backing vocals

Cover versions

 2012 – Christopher Holland, Corner Green

References

1973 songs
The Beach Boys songs
American rhythm and blues songs
Songs written by Brian Wilson
Songs written by Mike Love
Songs written by Jack Rieley
Song recordings produced by the Beach Boys